Listed below are examples of surviving buildings in Romanesque style in Europe, sorted by modern day countries.

List

Austria

 Gurk Cathedral, Gurk, Carinthia
 Ossiach Abbey, Ossiach, Carinthia
 Virgilkapelle, Vienna
 Millstatt Abbey, Millstatt, Carinthia
 , Hollabrunn, Lower Austria

Belgium

 Tournai Cathedral in Tournai
 , Hastière
 Collegiate Church of Saint Bartholomew, Liège
 Collegiate Church of Saint Gertrude in Nivelles
 , Celles
 Collegiate Church of Saint Ursmarus, Lobbes
 , Soignies
 , Ghent
 , Liège
 Church of Saint Remaclus, Ocquier
 , Nandrin
 Church of Saint Quentin, Tournai
 , Hamoir

Croatia
St. Anastasia, Zadar
St. Benedict, Split
St. Peter, Rab
St. Mary the Blessed, Rab

Czech Republic

 St. Longin's Rotunda in Prague
 Rotunda of the Finding of the Holy Cross in Prague
 St. George's Basilica, Prague (Bazilika svatého Jiří, Praha)
 St. Bartholomew's Church in Prague-Kyje
 St. George's Rotunda on Říp Mountain
 Castle and rotunda in Týnec nad Sázavou
 St. Peter and Paul (Petr a Pavel) Church in Poříčí nad Sázavou
 St. Jacob's (Jakub) Church in Cirkvice (near Kutná Hora)
 St. Procopius Basilica in Třebíč
 St. Peter's Rotunda in Starý Plzenec
 St. Peter and Paul Rotunda in Budeč (near Zákolany u Kladna)
 Rotunda of the Virgin Mary and St. Catherine in Znojmo
 St. Martin's Rotunda in Vyšehrad, Prague
 St. Catherine's Rotunda in Česká Třebová
 Basilica of the Assumption of the Virgin Mary in Tismice (near Český Brod)
 St. Bartholomew's Church in Kondrac (near Vlašim)
 Basilica of the Visitation of Our Lady, Premonstratensian Monastery in Milevsko
 Zdík's Palace (Zdíkův palác) in Olomouc
 Landštejn Castle, Landštejn
 Rotunda of St Wenceslaus, Malá Strana

France

Romanesque architecture expands in France through monasteries. Burgundy was the center of monastic life in France - one of the most important Benedictine monasteries of medieval Europe was located in Cluny. Pilgrimages also contributed to expansion of this style. Many pilgrims passed through France on their way to Santiago de Compostela.

French Romanesque schools of architecture, which are specific for every region, are characterised by the variety of stone vaulting.
Regions that developed distinctive styles are:
Burgundy
abbey church, Cluny
 Saint-Bénigne, Dijon
 Autun
 St Philibert at Tournus
Provence
 Church of St. Trophime and cloister, Arles
 Tour Fenestrelle, Uzès
 Abbey of Sénanque, Gordes
 Le Thoronet Abbey, Brignoles
 Fréjus Cathedral, Fréjus
 Silvacane Abbey, La Roque-d'Anthéron
 Montmajour Abbey, Arles
Aquitaine
 Saint-Front, Périgueux
 Notre-Dame-la-Grande, Poitiers
 Saint-Pierre, Angoulême
 Sainte-Croix, Bordeaux
Auvergne
Saint-Foy, Conques
Saint-Sernin, Toulouse
Notre-Dame-du-Port, Clermont-Ferrand
 Saint-Austremoine, Issoire
 Notre-Dame, Orcival
Normandy
Saint-Étienne, Caen,
abbey church, Jumièges, Seine-Maritime
abbey church of Saint-Georges-de-Boscherville, Seine-Maritime
Sainte-Trinité, Caen, Calvados
Cerisy-la-Forêt, Manche
Lessay, Manche
abbey church, Mont Saint-Michel, Avranches
  Saint-Nectaire
 Saint-Saturnin
 Sainte-Madeleine, Vezelay
 Basilica of Paray-le-Monial
 Abbey Church of Saint-Savin-sur-Gartempe
 Chapaize
 Abbatiale de Cruas
 Abbey of Vigeois, Limousin
 Fontevraud Abbey
 Saint-Martin-du-Canigou, Roussillon

Germany

 Bamberg Cathedral
 Bonn Minster
 Brunswick Cathedral
 Cologne
 the twelve Romanesque churches of Cologne, include Gross St Martin, St. Maria im Kapitol with fine wooden doors, the central plan St. Gereon, St. Aposteln, St. Pantaleon
 Freising, Cathedral
 Goslar Cathedral, Imperial Palace, Goslar
 Hildesheim
 Hildesheim Cathedral
 St. Michael's Church
 St. Godehard
 St. Mauritius Church
 Mainz Cathedral
 Maria Laach Abbey
 Naumburg Cathedral
 Regensburg: Schottenkirche St. Jakob
 Trier Cathedral
 Speyer Cathedral
 Straubing: St. Peter's Church
 Worms Cathedral
 Würzburg Cathedral

Hungary

 Calvinist church, Ócsa (e. 13th century)
 Parish church of the Annunciation of Our Lady, Türje (e. 13th century)
 Parish church of St. James the Apostle, Lébény (c. 1190-1212)
 Premontre monastery church, Zsámbék, (c. 1220–1235)
 Parish church of St. George, Ják (c. 1220-1256)
 Abbey Church of the Assumption of Our Lady, Belapatfalva (1232–1246)
 Cathedral of Pécs Pécs (11th century, 1882–1891)
 Royal palace at Esztergom Esztergom (10th-13th century)
 Pannonhalma Archabbey (certain parts) Pannonhalma (11th-13th century)

Ireland

 Cormac's Chapel, Cashel (1127–1134)
 Aghadoe, County Kerry (1158)
 Nuns' Church, Clonmacnoise (1167)
 Tuam Cathedral and Crosses (c. 1184)
 Ardmore Church and Round Tower, County Waterford
 Baltinglass Cistercian Abbey, County Wicklow
 Boyle Cistercian Abbey, County Roscommon
 Christ Church Cathedral, Dublin
 Clonfert Cathedral, County Galway
 Cong Abbey, County Galway
 Devenish Round Tower and Churches, County Fermanagh
 Dysert O'Dea Church and Round Tower, County Clare
 Freshford, County Kilkenny
 Jerpoint Cistercian Abbey, County Kilkenny
 Killeshin, County Laois
 Maghera, County Londonderry
 Monaincha Abbey and Cross, County Tipperary
 Rahan Church of Ireland Church, County Offaly
 Timahoe Round Tower, County Laois
 St. Saviour's, Glendalough

Italy
In Italy, the prevalent diffusion is in Lombardy, in Emilia - Romagna, in Tuscany, in the continental part of Veneto and in Apulia; everyone of these "Romanesque styles" has proper characteristics, for constructing methods and for materials. For example, a characteristic of Romanesque is that to change the classic elements with Christian elements, but in Tuscany and Apulia the classic decoratings remain.

Materials depended from the local disponibility, because the importation was too expensive. In fact, in Lombardy the most used material is ceramic, because of the argillous nature of the terrain; but that is not true for Como, where there were large diponibility of stone; in Tuscany buildings in white marble (from Carrara) are frequent, with inserts of green serpentin marble.

In Lombardy and Emilia, in that age united, in Romanesque epoque there was a great artistic flowering. The most monumental churches and cathedrals are often built with the campata system, with varying columns which weigh a tutto sesto arcos. In plain the material of construction is prevalently the mattone, but buildings in stone do not lack. The greater part of the Roman cities along the via Emilia is equipped in this age of monumental cathedral, between which they already maintain to the medieval system.

Abruzzo

San Clemente a Casauria
San Liberatore a Maiella
Santa Maria Arabona
Sant'Antimo Abbey

Aosta Valley
 Aosta Cathedral
 Collegiate church of Saint Ursus

Emilia-Romagna

 Modena Cathedral - 
 Abbey of San Mercuriale, Forlì and campanile - 
 Chiesa di S. Maria Oliveto (Albinea - province of Reggio Emilia)
 Parma Baptistery - 
 Parma Cathedral - 
 Piacenza Cathedral - 

Friuli-Venezia Giulia

 Basilica di Poppo, Aquileia, province of Udine
 Basilica patriarcale, Aquileia - province of Udine

Latium
 Cathedral of Acquapendente (province of Viterbo)
 Church of S. Maria della Libera (Aquino - province of Frosinone)

Lombardy

 Sant'Ambrogio, Milan
San Lorenzo, Milan
 Duomo vecchio, Brescia
 San Michele Maggiore, Pavia
 Cathedral of Monza
 S. Cosma e Damiano (Rezzago - province of Como)
 Madonna del Ghisallo (Magreglio - province of Como)
 S. Alessandro (Lasnigo - province of Como)
 S. Pietro (Albese - province of Como)
 Chiesa di S. Tommaso (Acquanegra sul Chiese - province of Mantova)
 Sant'Abbondio (Como)
 San Tomè (Almenno San Bartolomeo - province of Bergamo)

Marche

 Ancona Cathedral (Ancona)
 Santa Maria della Piazza, Ancona (Ancona)
 Pieve of S. Urbano (Apiro - province of Macerata)
San Vittore alle Chiuse

Piedmont

 Vezzolano Abbey (Albugnano - province of Asti)
 Crypt of Sant'Anastasio (Asti)
 Pieve of San Secondo (Cortazzone - province of Asti)
 San Secondo (Magnano)
 Church of Saints Nazarius and Celsus (Montechiaro - province of Asti)
 Pieve of San Lorenzo (Montiglio - province of Asti)
 San Michele, Oleggio
 Abbey of Santi Nazario e Celso (San Nazzaro Sesia - province of Novara)
 Abbey of Santa Fede (Cavagnolo - province of Tourin)
 Cattedrale dell'Addolorata (Acqui Terme - province of Alessandria)
 Church of S. Pietro (Albugnano - province of Asti)
 Baptistery of Agrate (Agrate Conturbia - province of Novara)
 Romanesque architecture in Canavese area Ivrea - 

Puglia

 Basilica of San Nicola, Bari
 Bari Cathedral
 Ruvo Cathedral
 Otranto Cathedral
 Barletta Cathedral
 Andria Cathedral
 Church of Saint Conrad, Molfetta
 Altamura Cathedral
 Basilica of Santa Maria Maggiore di Siponto
 Conversano cathedral
 Basilica del Santo Sepolcro, Barletta
 Cathedral of Bitonto
 Trani Cathedral

Sardinia
 S. Giusta (S. Giusta)
 S. Maria (Bonarcado)
 S. Paolo (Milis)
 S. Palmerio (Ghilarza)
 Il Carmine (Mogoro)
 S. Gregorio (Sardara)
 S. Leonardo (Masullas)
 S. Lussorio (Fordongianus)
 S. Gregorio (Solarussa)
 S. Nicola di Trullas (Semestene)
San Nicola di Silanis (Sedini)
 S. Pietro (Zuri - Sardinia
 S. Maria Maddalena (Silì)
 S. Maria della Mercede (Norbello)
 S. Pietro di Sorres (Borutta)
Santissima Trinità di Saccargia
Sant'Antioco di Bisarcio (Ozieri)
Santa Maria del Regno (Ardara)
San Simplicio, Olbia
Nostra Signora di Tergu
 S. Pantaleo (Dolianova)
 S. Alenixedda (Cagliari)
 S. Lorenzo (Silanus)
 S. Leonardo (Siete Fuentes)
 S. Maria (Uta)
 S. Maria (Tratalias)
 S. Pietro Extramuros (Bosa)
 S. Gavino (Porto Torres)

Sicily

 Cathedral, Cefalù
 Cathedral, Monreale
 Cathedral, Palermo
 Palatine Chapel in Norman Palace, Palermo
 Church of the Holy Spirit, Palermo
 Church of the Holy Spirit (Sicily), Palermo
 Church of San Cataldo, Palermo
 Church of Santi Pietro e Paolo d'Agrò Casalvecchio Siculo
 Church of Saints Peter and Paul, Itala
 Church of San Nicolò la Latina, Sciacca
 Church of Santa Maria della Raccomandata, Sciacca
 Church of Madonna delle Giummare, Mazara del Vallo
 Church of San Nicolò Regale, Mazara del Vallo
 Church of the Santissima Annunziata dei Catalani, Messina
 Abbey of the Santo Spirito, Caltanissetta
 Church of San Nicolò ai Cordari, Syracuse

Tuscany

 San Miniato al Monte, Florence
 Pisa Cathedral
 San Paolo a Ripa d'Arno, Pisa
 Santa Maria della Pieve, Arezzo
 Sant'Ambrogio, Florence
 Pieve of Romena, Pratovecchio, Arezzo
 Pieve of Làmulas (Arcidosso - province of Grosseto)
 Chiesa abbaziale (Abbadia Isola - province of Siena)
 Chiesa abbaziale (Abbadia San Salvatore - province of Siena)
 Abbey of San Galgano (province of Siena)
 Oratorio of Alpe di Poti, province of Arezzo
 Chiesa di S. Jacopo Maggiore (Altopascio - province of Lucca)
 Chiesa di S. Stefano (Anghiari - province of Arezzo)
 Parish church of Saints Ippolito and Cassiano

Umbria

 Basilica of Saint Francis of Assisi
 Cathedral of Spoleto
 San Francesco, Terni
 Chiesa di San Bernardino da Siena (La Pigge - Trevi - province of Perugia)
 Chiesa di Sant'Arcangelo (La Pigge - Trevi - province of Perugia)
 Eremo di San Marco e la grotta del Beato Ventura (La Pigge - Trevi - province of Perugia)
 Chiesa Tonda (La Pigge - Trevi - province of Perugia)
 S. Maria di Pietrarossa (Trevi - province of Perugia)
 S. Stefano di Piaggia (Trevi - province of Perugia)
 S. Nicolò (Trevi - province of Perugia)
 S. Fabiano (Trevi - province of Perugia)
 S. Tommaso (Trevi - province of Perugia)
 S. Sabino (Trevi - province of Perugia)
 S. Pietro a Pettine (Trevi - province of Perugia)
 S. Costanzo (Trevi - province of Perugia)
 S. Andrea (Trevi - province of Perugia)
 S. Egidio di Borgo (Trevi - province of Perugia)
 S. Donato (Trevi - province of Perugia)
 S. Leonardo del Colle (Trevi - province of Perugia)
 S. Martino in Manciano (Trevi - province of Perugia)
 S. Apollinare (Trevi - province of Perugia)
 S. Stefano in Manciano (Trevi - province of Perugia)
 S. Pietro in Bovara (Trevi - province of Perugia)
 S. Maria di Pelan (Trevi - province of Perugia)
 S. Paolo di Coste (Trevi - province of Perugia)
 S. Croce in Val dell'Aquila (Trevi - province of Perugia)
 S. Emiliano (Trevi - province of Perugia)

Veneto

 Basilica di San Zeno, Verona
 Santa Sofia Church (Padua)
 San Giacomo dell'Orio (Venice)
 San Lorenzo, Verona
 Santa Toscana, Verona
 Santa Maria Maggiore (Gazzo, province of Verona)
 S. Pietro (Villanova - province of Verona)
 S. Maria (Bonavigo - province of Verona)
 S. Michele (Belfiore - province of Verona)
 S. Andrea (Sommacampagna - province of Verona)

Netherlands

 Basilica of Saint Servatius, Maastricht (English:Saint Servaes)
 Onze-Lieve-Vrouwe, Maastricht (Church of Our Lady)
 Munsterkerk, Roermond
 , Utrecht (Saint John's Church)
 Pieterskerk, Utrecht (Saint Peters Church)
 St. Plechelmus, Oldenzaal (Saint Plecholmus Church)
 Chapel, Lemiers (Chapel)
 Reformed church, Oirschot
 Abbey church Rolduc, Kerkrade
 Susteren Abbey, Susteren
 St. Wiro, Plechelmus and Otgerus, Sint Odiliënberg
 St. Remigius, Klimmen

Poland
Greater Poland
 St. Trinity-Church in Strzelno
 St. Prokop-Rotunda in Strzelno
 St. Nicolaus-Church in Giecz
 Romanesque doors in Gniezno Cathedral
 Church of St. John from Jerusalem Outside the Walls in Poznań
 Born of Blessed Virgin Mary Church in Kotłów
 Benedictine Abbey in Mogilno

Kuyavia
 St. Peter and Paul-Collegiate in Kruszwica
 St. Mary-Church in Inowrocław
 St. Margaret Church in Kościelec Kujawski

Lesser Poland
 St. Andrew's Church in Kraków
 St. Adalbert Church in Kraków
 St. Leonard Crypt in Wawel, Kraków
 St. Nicholas Church in Wysocice
 St. John the Baptist church in Prandocin
Lublin Voivodeship
 Dungeon in Lublin Castle

Łódzkie
 St. Giles-Church in Inowłódz
 Church and campanile in Krzyworzeka
 Cistercians Abbey in Sulejów
 St. Ursula-Church in Strońsko
 Collegiate church in Tum
 St. Nicholas Church in Żarnów
Masovia
 Masovian Blessed Virgin Mary Cathedral in Płock
 Abbey church in Czerwińsk nad Wisłą

Silesia
 Saint Godehard-Rotunda in Strzelin
 St. Giles-Church in Wrocław
 Romanesque House in Wrocław
 St. Nicolaus-Rotunda in Cieszyn
 Castle in Będzin
 Blessed Virgin Mary-Church in Lwówek Śląski
 Blessed Virgin Mary church in Złotoryja
 South part and ruins of the chapel in Piast Castle in Legnica
 Blessed Virgin Mary church in Środa Śląska
 St. John the Baptist church in Siewierz
Świętokrzyskie
 St. Martin-Collegiate in Opatów
 St. Jacob-Church in Sandomierz
 St. Florian-Church in Koprzywnica
 Cistercians Abbey in Wąchock
 St. Giles-Church in Tarczek
 St. John the Baptist-Church in Grzegorzowice
 St. John the Baptist church in Skalbmierz
West Pomerania
 Knights Templar chapel in Rurka
 Knights Templar chapel in Chwarszczany
 Cistercians Abbey in Kołbacz
Ziemia Lubuska
 Blessed Virgin Mary Church in Lubsko
 Church in Biedrzychowice
 St. Andrew's Church in Szprotawa

Portugal

 Ganfei Convent in Valença, destroyed in 1000 by the Muslims, rebuilt in 1018, façade and main chapel changed in later periods, the rest of the temple is Romanesque
 Pombeiro Monastery in Felgueiras, began in 1059, only the apse and the portal are from this period)
 Church and tower of the Travanca Monastery in Amarante, Preromanesque, Romanesque reconstruction in 1096, most of the building remained intact since the 13th century
 Lisbon Cathedral, began in 1147. Romanesque portals and nave
 Braga Cathedral, began in the first half of the 12th century. Romanesque portals and nave
 Oporto Cathedral, began in the first half of the 12th century. Romanesque nave
 Castle of Almourol, built after 1160 by the Knights Templar
 Old Cathedral of Coimbra, began 1162
 Round church in the Convent of the Order of Christ in Tomar, 12th century, built by the Knights Templar
 Church of Cedofeita in Oporto, second half of the 12th century
 Monastery of Rates  in Póvoa de Varzim , most of the building is from the 12th century, except the main chapel
 Domus Municipalis, Bragança

Romania
St. Michael's Cathedral, Alba Iulia, began in 1009, reconstructed 1246-1291.
St. Michael's fortified church, Cisnădioara, late 12th century.
Herina Evangelical Church, Herina, raised by the Order of Saint Benedict 1250-1260.
Cluj-Mănăștur Calvaria Church, Cluj-Napoca, 9th-10th centuries, reconstructed 1896.
Cincu Evangelical fortified church, Cincu, 13th century.
Reformed church of Acâș, Acâș, early 13th century.
Dormition of the Theotokos Church, Strei 1270 or middle 14th century.
Evangelical fortified church in Vurpăr, Vurpăr, early 13th century.
Reformed Church in Ocna Sibiului, Ocna Sibiului, 1240-1280.
Rotunda church in Geoagiu, Geoagiu, 11th century

Serbia
Voljavča monastery (1050)
The Tracts of Saint George monastery, Novi Pazar (1166). See Đurđevi stupovi built by Stefan Nemanja in the 12th century.
Đurđevi stupovi, Montenegro, founded by Stefan Prvoslav, the nephew of Stefan Nemanja in 1213.
The Studenica monastery (1190)
Patriarchal Monastery of Peć (13th century)
Pridvorica Monastery (12th century)
Žiča crowning church, Kraljevo (1217)
Arača (around 1230) 
Mileševa monastery (1234)
Morača (monastery) (1252)
The Sopoćani monastery (1265)
Gradac Monastery (1270)
Tronoša Monastery (1276)
Church of St. Achillius, Arilje (1296)
Gračanica Monastery (1321)
Visoki Dečani monastery, Kosovo (1327)
Vojlovica monastery (1375)
Ravanica Monastery (1375)
Ljubostinja (1388)
Kalenić monastery (1407)
Church of Saint Mary, Morović

Slovakia

During the time of early Christianity every 10 villages were ordered to build a church. Several rotunda have been built in this time.
 Boldog, Romanesque church with Gothic modifications. 
 Spišská Kapitula, an ecclesiastical town with a Romanesque cathedral
 Nitra-Drazovce, a tiny Romanesque church on the hill above the village
 Levice-Kalinciakovo, a well preserved tiny Romanesque church built of hewn stone
 The Church of Saint George, Nitrianska_Blatnica,  the Great Moravian period or shortly after
 Haluzice, Nové Mesto nad Váhom, Romanesque church
 Sedmerovec-Pominovce
 Diakovce, Romanesque cathedral
 Boldog, Romanesque Church
 Bíňa, Premontre Abbey monastery in the romanesque style
 Veľký Klíž, Partizánske, Church
 Romanesque Church in Veľká Tŕňa
 Romanesque church in Kšinná

Spain

Before Cluny`s influence, Romanesque first developed in Spain in the 10th and 11th centuries in Catalonia, Huesca and the Aragonese Pyrenees, simultaneously with the north of Italy, into what has been called "First Romanesque" or "Lombard Romanesque". It is a primitive style whose characteristics are thick walls, lack of sculpture and the presence of rhythmic ornamental arches.

Romanesque architecture truly arrives with the influence of Cluny through the Way of Saint James pilgrimage route that ends in the Cathedral of Santiago de Compostela. The model of the Spanish Romanesque in the 12th century was the Cathedral of Jaca, with its characteristic apse structure and plan, and its "chess" decoration in strips called taqueado jaqués. As the Christian kingdoms advanced towards the South, this model spread throughout the reconquered areas with some variations. Spanish Romanesque was also influenced by the Spanish pre-Romanesque styles, mainly the Asturian and the Mozarab. But there is also a strong influence from the moorish architecture, so close in space, specially the vaults of Córdoba`s Mosque, and the polylobulated arches. In the 13th century, some Romanesque churches were built with early Gothic architectural elements. Aragón, Catalonia, Castile and Navarra are the areas where numerous examples of Spanish Romanesque can be found.

Aragon
Province of Huesca
 Monastery of San Pedro el Viejo
 Jaca Cathedral
 Loarre castle
 San Juan de la Peña
 Churches of San Caprasio and Santa María in Santa Cruz de la Serós
 San Adrián de Sasabe
 Santa Maria de Iguacel
 Church of Santiago in Agüero
 Serrablo churches
Province of Zaragoza
 Real Monasterio de Nuestra Señora de Rueda, Aragon region

Cantabria
 Santillana del Mar Collegiate Church and cloister
 Collegiate Church of San Pedro de Cervatos

Catalonia
Province of Barcelona
 Sant Benet de Bages
 Churches of Saint Mary (old Cathedral), Saint Peter and Saint Michael in Terrassa

Province of Lleida
 Sant Climent de Taüll, Vall de Boí

Province of Girona
 Girona Cathedral
 Sant Pere de Galligants
 Sant Pere de Rodes
 Monastery of Santa Maria de Ripoll
 Sant Pere, Camprodon
 Abbey of Saint-Michel-de-Cuxa
 Sant Quirze de Colera

Province of Tarragona
 Tarragona Cathedral

Castile and León
Province of Avila
 Church of San Vicente
 Ermita de San Pelayo y San Isidoro, formerly in Ávila, moved to Madrid

Province of Burgos
 Monastery of Santo Domingo de Silos
 San Juan de Ortega Church

Province of León
 Basilica of San Isidoro, with "Royal Pantheon"
 Arbás Church

Province of Palencia
 Carrión de los Condes Church of Santiago
 Carrión de los Condes Church of Santa María de las Victorias
 Aguilar de Campoo Church of Santa Cecilia
 Monastery of Santa María la Real in Aguilar de Campoo
 Arenillas de San Pelayo Church of San Pelayo
 Barrio de Santa María Church of Santa Eulalia
 Cillamayor Church of Santa María la Real
 St. Martin, Frómista
 Olmos de Ojeda Church of Santa Eufemia
 San Salvador de Cantamuda Collegiate Church

Province of Salamanca
 Salamanca Cathedral

Province of Segovia
 Duratón La Asunción de María, church
 Fuentidueña Church of San Miguel
 Grado del Pico Church of San Pedro
 Perorrubio Church of San Pedro
 Requijada Church of Virgen de Las Vegas
 San Pedro de Gaillos Church
 Sepúlveda Church of San Salvador

Province of Soria
 Soria, Santo Domingo
 Soria San Juan de Duero, Cloister

Province of Zamora
 Zamora Cathedral
 Other Romanesque buildings in Zamora
 Benavente: Church of Santa María del Azogue
 Santa María la Mayor, Collegiate Church, Toro, province of Zamora

Galicia
Province of A Coruña
 Santiago de Compostela Cathedral
 Santiago de Compostela Gelmirez Palace
 Santiago de Compostela Santa María del Sar (Colegiata)
 A Coruña Church of Santiago
 A Coruña Collegiate Church of Santa María del Campo

Province of Lugo
 Lugo Cathedral
 Noia Church of San Martiño
 Church of San Juan of Portomarín
 Vilar de Donas, Monastery
 Sarria, Church
 Barbadelo, Church

Province of Ourense
 Cathedral, Ourense, Romanesque and Gothic

Madrid
 Church of San Juan Bautista (Talamanca de Jarama)

Navarra
 San Pedro de la Rúa. Church and cloister. Estella
 Church of San Miguel, Estella 
 Palace of the Kings of Navarra, Estella 
 Church of Santo Sepulcro, Torres del Río
 Monastery of Leyre (San Salvador de Leyre) Abbey
 Church of Santa María la Real, Sangüesa

Norway 

 Hamar Cathedral, Hamar
 Nidaros Cathedral, Trondheim

Sweden

 Akebäck Church, Akebäck
 Anga Church, Anga
 Bjäresjö Church, 
 Dalby Church, Dalby
 Gamla Uppsala kyrka, Gamla Uppsala
 Garde Church, Garde
 Havdhem Church, Havdhem
 Lund Cathedral, Lund
 Vä Church, Vä

Switzerland
Abbey of Romainmôtier Abbey
Church of Saint-Sulpice, Vaud
Grossmünster Church, Zurich
Münster Schaffhausen
Payerne
Rüeggisberg Priory

Turkey
Galata Tower, Galata, Istanbul

Ukraine
 Saint Pantaleon church, Shevchenkove
 Saints Borys and Hlib Cathedral in Chernihiv
 Pyatnytska Church in Chernihiv
 Church of the Dormition, Krylos

United Kingdom

England
In England, Romanesque architecture is often termed 'Norman architecture'. Castles, cathedrals and churches of the Norman period have frequently been extended during later periods. It is normal to find Norman in combination with Gothic architecture.

 Durham Cathedral is regarded as the finest Norman building in England.
 Peterborough Cathedral is an intact Norman cathedral except for the early Gothic west front and late Gothic eastern ambulatory.
 Ely Cathedral: the nave is Norman and west front Norman and Transitional
 Norwich Cathedral, excluding the Gothic spire and vault
 Canterbury Cathedral: the crypt, chapels and two small towers remain from the previous building destroyed by fire.
 Hereford Cathedral
 Southwell Minster
 St Albans Cathedral
 Gloucester cathedral, the nave arcades
 Tewkesbury abbey church
 Rochester Cathedral
 St Bartholomew-the-Great, Smithfield, London
 Patrixbourne Church, Kent
 Barfrestone Church, Kent
 Tixover church
 Bradford Church of St. Chad, West Yorkshire
 Kilpeck Church
 Leominster Priory
 Oakham castle hall, a unique survival in England of the hall of a Norman fortified manor house
 Tower of London: the keep known as the White Tower
 Norwich Castle
 Ludlow Castle
 Rochester Castle, Kent
 The Holy Sepulchre, Cambridge
 Waltham Abbey Church, Essex
 St John's Priory Crypt, London

Scotland
 Dunnottar Castle, older portions as Romanesque
 Muchalls Castle, ground level groin vault course only
 Myres Castle, undercroft only survives as Romaneseque
 St. Margaret's Chapel in Edinburgh Castle

See also
 
Romanesque architecture 
List of regional characteristics of Romanesque churches 
Romanesque secular and domestic architecture
Pre-Romanesque art and architecture
Ottonian architecture
Romanesque art
Romanesque sculpture
Renaissance of the 12th century
Romanesque Revival architecture
Medieval architecture
Romano-Gothic architecture

.01
Romanesque architecture